Simon Reed may refer to:

Simon Reed, commentator for Eurosport and ITV's Dancing on Ice, brother of Oliver Reed
Simon Reed, captain of the Lady Lovibond
Simon Reed, comic book artist with Simon Bisley for Full Circle

See also
Simon Read (disambiguation)
Simone Reed, participant in Big Brother (British series 18)